Hugheston is an unincorporated community in Kanawha County, West Virginia, United States. Hugheston is located on the north bank of the Kanawha River across from Pratt. Hugheston has a post office with ZIP code 25110. The average household income is $32,436.

The community most likely derives its name from Robert Hughes, a local pioneer who was kidnapped by Indians.

Historian and noted author Otis K. Rice was born in Hugheston on June 6, 1919. Rice was named West Virginia’s first Historian Laureate in 2003.

References

Unincorporated communities in Kanawha County, West Virginia
Unincorporated communities in West Virginia
Coal towns in West Virginia
Populated places on the Kanawha River